The 14719 / 14720 Bikaner–Bilaspur Antyodaya Express is an Express train belonging to North Western Railway zone that runs between  and .

It is being operated with 14719/14720 train numbers on a weekly basis.

Coach composition 

The trains is completely general coaches trains designed by Indian Railways with features of LED screen display to show information about stations, train speed etc. Vending machines for water. Bio toilets in compartments as well as CCTV cameras and mobile charging points and toilet occupancy indicators.

Service

14719 Bikaner–Bilaspur Antyodaya Express has an average speed of 52 km/hr and covers 1946 km in 37 hrs 30 mins.
14720 Bilaspur–Bikaner Antyodaya Express has an average speed of 51 km/hr and covers 1946 km in 38 hrs 10 mins.

Service discontinued due to a low occupancy from 11 June 2020.

Route & halts

The important halts of the train are:

Schedule

Direction reversal

Train reverses its direction at:

Traction

After Sawai Madhopur Junction, both trains are hauled by an Electric Loco Shed, Lallaguda or Royapuram-based WAP-7.

See also 
 Antyodaya Express

Notes

References 

Antyodaya Express trains
Rail transport in Rajasthan
Rail transport in Chhattisgarh
Railway services introduced in 2018